Cristelo may refer to:

Places in Portugal
 Cristelo (Barcelos), a parish in the municipality of Barcelos
 Cristelo (Caminha), a parish in the municipality of Caminha
 Cristelo (Paredes), a parish in the municipality of Paredes
 Cristelo (Paredes de Coura), a parish in the municipality of Paredes de Coura